Sun Valley is a small city in Lamar County, Texas, United States. The population was 69 at the 2010 census, up from 51 at the 2000 census; in 2020, its population was 70.

Geography

Sun Valley is located in eastern Lamar County at  (33.666881, –95.427795). U.S. Route 82 touches the southern part of the Sun Valley city limits. The area drains south to Mulberry Creek, part of the Sulphur River watershed flowing east into Arkansas.

Demographics

As of the census of 2000, there were 51 people, 18 households, and 14 families residing in the city. The population density was 332.0 people per square mile (131.3/km). There were 31 housing units at an average density of 201.8/sq mi (79.8/km). The racial makeup of the city was 86.27% White, 13.73% from other races. Hispanic or Latino of any race were 15.69% of the population.

There were 18 households, out of which 50.0% had children under the age of 18 living with them, 61.1% were married couples living together, 11.1% had a female householder with no husband present, and 16.7% were non-families. 16.7% of all households were made up of individuals, and 5.6% had someone living alone who was 65 years of age or older. The average household size was 2.83 and the average family size was 3.07.

In the city, the population was spread out, with 25.5% under the age of 18, 15.7% from 18 to 24, 27.5% from 25 to 44, 27.5% from 45 to 64, and 3.9% who were 65 years of age or older. The median age was 32 years. For every 100 females, there were 121.7 males. For every 100 females age 18 and over, there were 100.0 males.

The median income for a household in the city was $27,500, and the median income for a family was $28,333. Males had a median income of $23,036 versus $26,250 for females. The per capita income for the city was $24,129. None of the population or families were below the poverty line.

Education
Sun Valley is served by the North Lamar Independent School District.

References

Cities in Texas
Cities in Lamar County, Texas